The Nagura Formation is a palaeontological formation located in Japan. It dates to the Middle Miocene period.

See also 
 List of fossil sites

Further reading 
  (1993); Wildlife of Gondwana. Reed. 

Geologic formations of Japan
Neogene System of Asia
Neogene Japan
Miocene Series
Paleontology in Japan
Formations